Kazlıçeşme railway station is a railway station in Zeytinburnu, Istanbul and the current terminus of the trans-Bosporus Marmaray commuter rail line. Located just outside of the city's historic walled center, Kazlıçeşme station sits between 10. Yıl Avenue and Zakirbaşı Street.

History

Kazlıçeşme station was opened on 4 December 1955 by the Turkish State Railways as a stop on the Istanbul suburban line. Kazlıçeşme was chosen as the western portal of the Marmaray tunnel and the construction of a new station started in 2011. The new station had the same platform design, but added a third track for passing intercity and regional trains. Nearing the completion of the tunnel, Kazlıçeşme station was closed on 1 March 2013 and demolished shortly after. Seven months later, on 29 October 2013, the new Kazlıeşme station opened as the western terminus of Marmaray trains from Ayrılıkçeşmesi in Kadıköy. However, due to contractor issues, phase II of the Marmaray project was delayed, effectively cutting off Kazlıçeşme from the rest of the national rail network for a few years until work restarted in mid-2016. Once phase II completed on March 12, 2019, Kazlıçeşme is a stop on the Halkalı to Gebze commuter rail line.

Layout

Equipment
The railway station features following equipment:
 2 entrance and exit gates,
 2 escalators,
 1 elevator,
 2 ticket offices,
 1 ticket vending machine,
 1 credit loading machine for electronic tickets,
 8 turnstiles including 2 for physically handicapped people and
 10 passenger information screens.

References

Railway stations in Istanbul Province
Railway stations opened in 1872
Zeytinburnu
Marmaray
1872 establishments in the Ottoman Empire